Bremen is the third album by Kenshi Yonezu. It was released on October 7, 2015 by Universal Sigma.

Background 
The title was inspired by Will-O-Wisp and the musicians of Bremen. "Will-O-Wisp illustrates a scene of turning your back to the light of a prosperous town and heading into the darkness along a dilapidated highway, and the musicians of Bremen get tired of where they currently are and do not like living there anymore, so they say let's go to Bremen and play music there. But The Musicians of Bremen never actually reach Bremen in the end. Kenshi hoped to express that journey and progress is more important than destination with the album."

Track listing 
 "Unbelievers" (アンビリーバーズ)
 "Fluorite" (フローライト)
 "Saijōei" (再上映 "Rerun")
 "Flowerwall"
 "Atashi wa Yūrei" (あたしはゆうれい "I'm a Ghost")
 "Will o' Wisp" (ウィルオウィスプ)
 "Undercover"
 "Neon Sign"
 "Metronome" (メトロノーム)
 "Ame no Gairo ni Yakōchū" (雨の街路に夜光蟲 "Luminescent Bug on a Rainy Street")
 "Cinderella Gray" (シンデレラグレイ)
 "Mirage Song" (ミラージュソング)
 "Hopeland" (ホープランド)
 "Blue Jasmine"

Charts

References 

2015 albums
Kenshi Yonezu albums
Universal Sigma albums